Jack T. O'Connell (born October 8, 1951) is an American politician, educator and formerly the 26th California State Superintendent of Public Instruction, having been elected to the post in November 2002 with 61% of the vote. He was re-elected to his post by receiving a majority (52%) of the vote in the Primary election on June 6, 2006, thus avoiding a November run-off. He is a member of the Democratic Party. O'Connell was unable to run for a third term in 2010 due to term limits and was succeeded by former state assemblyman Tom Torlakson.

Career
Before his election to the Legislature, O'Connell served on the Santa Barbara County School Board. O'Connell previously served in the California State Senate representing the 18th District from 1994 to 2002. O'Connell considered a bid for President Pro Tem of the State Senate in 1998 but ultimately decided not to run. He also served in the California State Assembly representing the Central Coast-based 35th District from 1982 to 1994. From 1994 to 1996, O'Connell employed as a legislative aide Tara Reade, who had recently left the office of then-U.S. Senator Joe Biden.

In his 2006 re-election campaign, O'Connell won every county in California with at least an electoral plurality. Although the State Superintendent of Public Instruction is officially a non-partisan position, O'Connell is a member of the Democratic Party, and political parties will routinely make endorsements of candidates in the election (which was the case with O'Connell).

Personal life
O'Connell was born in Glen Cove, New York. In 1958, he moved with his family to Southern California, where he attended local public schools. He received a Bachelor of Arts degree in history from California State University, Fullerton and earned his secondary teaching credential from California State University, Long Beach in 1975. He returned to Oxnard High School, his high school alma mater, to teach for several years and later served on the Santa Barbara County School Board.

See also
 California Charter Academy

References

External links

Join California Jack O'Connell

1951 births
Living people
Democratic Party California state senators
California State University, Fullerton alumni
California State University, Long Beach alumni
Democratic Party members of the California State Assembly
Politicians from Glen Cove, New York
People from Oxnard, California
University of California regents
California Superintendents of Public Instruction
21st-century American politicians
20th-century American politicians